Litoporus saul is a cellar spider species found in French Guiana.

References 

Pholcidae
Spiders described in 2000
Spiders of South America
Fauna of French Guiana